Warrick Giddey (born 16 December 1967) is an Australian basketball coach and former professional player who is the head coach for the Melbourne Tigers women's team of NBL1 South.

Playing career
Giddey played 449 games in the National Basketball League (NBL) for the Illawarra Hawks and Melbourne Tigers. Giddey won two NBL championships as a member of the Tigers in 1993 and 1997.

Giddey's number 6 was retired by the Tigers and his jersey hangs in the rafters of John Cain Arena.

Post-playing career
Giddey remained associated with the Tigers after his playing retirement. He ran the Community and School programs for the team under its new name Melbourne United. He previously worked as an assistant coach and in club administration.

On 4 February 2022, Giddey was named as head coach of the Melbourne Tigers women's team for the 2022 NBL1 South season.

Personal life
Giddey's wife, Kim, played in the Women's National Basketball League. Their son, Josh, played in the NBL for the Adelaide 36ers and was selected sixth in the 2021 NBA draft by the Oklahoma City Thunder. Their daughter, Hannah, plays college basketball for the Oral Roberts Golden Eagles.

References

External links
FIBA profile

1967 births
Living people
Australian men's basketball coaches
Australian men's basketball players
Basketball players from New South Wales
Forwards (basketball)
Illawarra Hawks players
Melbourne Tigers players